The southern banded guitarfish (Zapteryx xyster), also known as the witch guitarfish, is a species of fish in the Rhinobatidae family found at reefs and other habitats from shallow water to a depth of  in the tropical East Pacific. It ranges from Mazatlan, Mexico, to Colombia, but it likely also occurs off Ecuador and Peru.It is threatened by habitat loss. It is closely related to the more northernly distributed banded guitarfish (Z. exasperata).

References

southern banded guitarfish
Fish of Colombia
Fish of Ecuador
Western Central American coastal fauna
southern banded guitarfish
Taxa named by David Starr Jordan 
Taxonomy articles created by Polbot